Maya Isacowitz (Maya Isac in short, born 1987) is an Israeli singer-songwriter who sings in English.

Biography
Maya Isacowitz was born in 1987 in Ma'ayan Baruch, Israel, to South African parents who made aliyah to Israel. Her father, Peter, is wood artist and musician who builds ethnic musical instruments. In her childhood the family moved to Karkom, Israel. At the age of 14 she started playing guitar and singing. As early as 16 she recorded a demo and distributed it through friends.

At the age of 21, she independently recorded her debut album, Safe & Sound. The album have been sold in her concerts.

In August 2011, she re-released her debut album through the Israeli label High Fidelity. Three of the album songs were released as singles: Is It Alright, Safe & Sound and Brave Again. The album sold more than 15,000 copies by 2014, becoming gold record. In 2012 she won ACUM award for best new artist. That year she participated in one song of Infected Mushroom  album, Army of Mushrooms. In 2013 she moved to New York City and worked on her second album with the Israeli producer J.Views. While in New York, Isacowitz toured the states, featured in South by Southwest festival, Mountain Jam festival and an opening act for Suzanne Vega. In August 2015 she released her second album, All of the Miles. After releasing the new album she returned to Israel for a tour. In February 2019 she released SPARKLE, an EP produced by Tomer Yosef.

Discography
 Safe & Sound (2011)
 All of the Miles (2015)
 SPARKLE (2019)

References

External links
 Official website
 Official YouTube channel

1987 births
Living people
Israeli women singer-songwriters
Israeli rock singers
Israeli folk singers
Jewish folk singers
21st-century Israeli women singers
Israeli people of South African-Jewish descent